Roger Jansson (13 May 1959 – 28 October 1994) was a Swedish sports shooter. He competed in two events at the 1984 Summer Olympics.

References

External links
 

1959 births
1994 deaths
Swedish male sport shooters
Olympic shooters of Sweden
Shooters at the 1984 Summer Olympics
Sportspeople from Uppsala
20th-century Swedish people